The National Lottery Results (previously The National Lottery Live, The National Lottery Draw, The National Lottery Stars and The National Lottery Draws) is the television programme that broadcasts the drawing of the National Lottery in the United Kingdom.

History
The programme launched on 19 November 1994 on BBC One, and was initially broadcast live on Saturday nights, before expanding to Wednesday nights in 1997 and Friday nights in 2008. From January 2013 to December 2016, the programme aired only on Saturday nights. Since January 2017, the live draws are no longer broadcast on television and are available to watch online at the National Lottery website and YouTube.

Since April 2018, a new show called The National Lottery Lotto Results has aired on ITV on Wednesday and Saturday nights during commercial breaks. Presented by Stephen Mulhern, the show features that night's winning Lotto numbers, and spotlights a National Lottery-funded location. The actual Lotto draw itself is not broadcast, and remains online.

Presenters
The first show was presented by Noel Edmonds. Afterwards, it was co-presented by Anthea Turner and Gordon Kennedy, later replaced by Bob Monkhouse, all of them assisted by the psychic Mystic Meg and numbers expert Sam Weren. Carol Vorderman had a segment during the early years of the show whereby, she would use mathematical techniques to predict the winning numbers. When Gordon left, Anthea remained as solo host and was followed by a number of presenters over the years.

Commentary on the draws has, since 1995, been provided by Alan Dedicoat, who earned the nickname The Voice of the Balls. During the live show era, in the event of Dedicoat being unavailable, commentary was provided by fellow BBC Radio 2 announcer Charles Nove.

Richard Madeley
John Cleese
Jane Moore
Kaye Adams
Dale Winton
Gaby Roslin (2014–16)
Kate Garraway (2014–16)
Ore Oduba (2015–16)
Sonali Shah (2015–16)
Connie Fisher
Anthea Turner (1994–1996)
Gordon Kennedy (1994–95)
Bob Monkhouse (1996–97, 1998)
Noel Edmonds (First show, 1994)
Ulrika Jonsson
Carol Smillie
Bruce Forsyth
Terry Wogan (1998)
John Partridge
Brian Conley
Jenni Falconer (2007–2015)
OJ Borg (2010–2013)
Duncan James (2006–2008)
Kirsty Gallacher (2007–2009)
Gethin Jones (2008–2010)
Christopher Biggins (2009)
Myleene Klass (2006–2008, 2010–2013)
Scott Mills (2008–2013)
Christine Bleakley (2009)
Matt Johnson (2013)
Chris Evans (2013)

Draw masters

Paul Van Den Bosch
Matthew Chamberlain 
Jeff Brewin
Julie Hamilton
John Willen 
Martin McClure
Mick Lawes
Paul Cartwright
Louise Walters

Stand-in presenters

Carol Machin
John Barrowman
James McCourt
Sarah Cawood
Michael Ball (2007)
 Jenny Powell (2010)
Bradley Walsh (2007)
Tim Vincent (2007)
Tim Lovejoy (2009)
Lisa Snowdon (2011)

Current shows

Saturday night draws
From 1998 to 2016, the Saturday night draws were usually presented as part of a game show that is shown to be associated with the lottery branding. The game shows were previously broadcast live, with the game show host also presenting the lottery draws, though since 2002, there would also be a draw presenter that would tell the viewers about how to play the draws and what the Lotto jackpot is, etc. Since 23 September 2006, most of the game shows were pre-recorded, with the live lottery draws included as a separate segment with a different presenter. The draws on Saturday night consisted of "Thunderball" followed by "Lotto" a few minutes later, though in the past "Lotto Extra" and its replacement "Dream Number" would also be shown too; both now retired draws. Since 2014, "Lotto Raffle" is no longer featured during the draws. These gameshows usually aired at about 8.00pm, meaning the draw was a lot earlier than when there is no gameshows, when the draw was around 10.00pm. A new gameshow has been released every year, except 2010, 2012, and 2016.

Gaby Roslin hosted the final live draw on 31 December 2016, with Alan Dedicoat joining her in vision to close the show. From 7 January 2017, with the move to the BBC iPlayer, the programme featured no presenter with Dedicoat continuing to announce the draws using pre-recorded commentary.

Lottery update
On BBC One on Saturday nights straight after the BBC Weekend News (previously Match of the Day), a segment known as Lottery update is broadcast showing the results of the day's Lotto and Thunderball draws and also how many winners there are. The same thing is also broadcast on BBC One on Tuesday nights after the local news opt-out showing the results of the Tuesday EuroMillions draw and UK millionaire raffle.

Former shows

Wednesday night draws
A new midweek National Lottery Draw was introduced and aired on BBC1 from 5 February 1997 to 26 December 2012. From 2 January 2013, the Wednesday draws are available to watch exclusively on the National Lottery's website.

Wednesday night presenters

 Bradley Walsh (2007–2008)
 Michael Ball (2006–2007, 2009)
 Jenni Falconer (2006–2008, 2010–2012)
 Duncan James (2007–2008)
 Scott Mills (2007–2012)
 Kirsty Gallacher (2007)
 Tim Vincent (2008)
 Gethin Jones (2008–2010)
 Myleene Klass (2008–2012)
 Jamelia (2008–2009)
 Jodie Prenger (2009–2011)
 OJ Borg (2009–2012)
 Debra Stephenson (2010)
 Melinda Messenger (2010)

Friday night draws
The Friday night draws showed the EuroMillions results and the Thunderball draw and are usually broadcast at 23:15. The Friday night draws were the only draws not to be broadcast live. From January 2013, the Friday draws are available to watch exclusively on the National Lottery's website. There is still a results update on BBC One at 22:35.

Friday night presenters

 Sarah Cawood
 Carole Machin
 Tim Vincent (2008–2009)
 Myleene Klass (2010–2011)
 OJ Borg (2010–2012)
 Debra Stephenson (2010)
 Gethin Jones (2010)
 Jenni Falconer (2011)
 Scott Mills (2012)
 Matt Johnson (2012)

Saturday night game shows
Between 1998 and when the televised draws were decommissioned at the end of 2016, eighteen National Lottery game shows had aired. Who Dares Wins, hosted by Nick Knowles, continued to air until 2019, but without the National Lottery branding.

National Lottery Stars
National Lottery Stars were held each year and aired on BBC One between 2010 and 2019. Until 2015, the ceremony's name was The National Lottery Awards.

Presenters
John Barrowman (2010, 2012–16)
Myleene Klass (2011)
Ore Oduba (2017—2019)

Studios
The National Lottery draws were originally filmed at BBC Television Centre in London. From 2006 to 2013, it was filmed at Arqiva Chalfont Grove studios in Chalfont St Peter, Buckinghamshire in a set known as Lottery HQ. From January 2013, it has been filmed from Pinewood Studios. The EuroMillions draw takes place in a dedicated studio in Paris, France. The draw is occasionally shown at other locations for special events such as The National Lottery Awards ceremony.

Broadcasting
Until 2017, the programme was usually broadcast on BBC One, although it was occasionally shown on BBC Two if BBC One was unable to show it. The BBC were granted the rights in 1994 after defeating a rival bid from ITV. The programme was also broadcast on BBC Radio 1 (or Radio 1 FM as it was then known) and later, it was broadcast on BBC Radio 5 Live.

Incidents
 On 30 November 1996, live on air, the draw machine failed to start, causing the draw to be delayed by 50 minutes; Bob Monkhouse, the host that night, said that Mystic Meg had been predicting it all day.
 In the Thunderball Draw that took place on 17th February 2001, during the Jet Set programme that evening, the column that lifts the balls up in the first draw machine initially failed to lift a ball for the second number, with the column eventually lifting without a ball and then not lowering for some time for it to retry lifting a second ball. It later repeated this for the fifth ball.
 On 20 May 2006, during the draw on the National Lottery game show Jet Set, several members of the group Fathers 4 Justice protested on the set, causing the show to be taken off air for several minutes while the protesters were removed from the studio. The Lotto and Lotto Extra draws then took place quickly and finished on time for the broadcast of the Eurovision Song Contest 2006 on BBC One, as missing the start of the contest would be a breach of rules.
 On 7 November 2015, the Lotto draw machine failed to release all the balls, causing the draw to be postponed. The draw later took place off air, and the results were posted on the website.

References

External links

The National Lottery Live

BBC Television shows
1994 British television series debuts
2000s British television series
2010s British television series
2020s British television series
English-language television shows
British live television series
Television series by Endemol
British game shows about lotteries